Most Australian towns and cities have a World War I or ANZAC, and/or World War II memorial or Cenotaph.

Listing and photographs are by state and territory:

Australian Capital Territory

New South Wales

Memorials for people

Northern Territory

Queensland
The Queensland War Memorial Register is maintained by the Queensland Government in collaboration with local government authorities in Queensland and the Returned and Services League of Australia. It was established in 2008 and, as at 14 November 2017, lists 1398 war memorials in Queensland.

The war memorials in Queensland take many forms but are predominantly either outdoor monuments, memorial buildings or memorial components within other structures. Notable war memorials include:
 ANZAC Square, Brisbane 
 Anning Monument
 Anzac Avenue Memorial Trees
 Anzac Memorial Park, Townsville
 Apple Tree Creek War Memorial
 Aramac War Memorial
 Atherton War Memorial
 Baralaba, Queensland
 Barcaldine Shire Hall
 Barcaldine War Memorial Clock
 Beaudesert War Memorial
 Berry and MacFarlane Monument
 Boer War Memorial, Allora
 Boer War Memorial, Gatton
 Boer War Veterans Memorial Kiosk and Lissner Park
 Boonah War Memorial
 Booval War Memorial
 Brooweena War Memorial
 Bulimba Memorial Park
 Bundaberg War Memorial
 Bundaberg War Nurses Memorial
 Cairns War Memorial
 Cardwell Divisional Board Hall
 Caskey Monument
 Charleville War Memorial
 Chinchilla Digger Statue
 Cleveland War Memorials
 Coorparoo School of Arts and RSL Memorial Hall
 Cooyar War Memorial
 Coronation Lamp War Memorial
 Cunnamulla War Memorial Fountain
 Dalby War Memorial and Gates
 Enoggera Memorial Hall
 Esk War Memorial
 Eumundi War Memorial Trees
 Evelyn Scrub War Memorial
 Finch Hatton War Memorial
 First World War Honour Board, Lands Administration Building
 First World War Honour Board, National Australia Bank (308 Queen Street)
 Forest Hill War Memorial
 Gair Park
 Gayndah War Memorial
 Goombungee War Memorial
 Goomeri Hall of Memory
 Goomeri War Memorial Clock
 Goondiwindi War Memorial
 Graceville Memorial Park
 Greenmount War Memorial
 Gympie Memorial Park
 Gympie and Widgee War Memorial Gates
 Herberton War Memorial
 Howard War Memorial
 Ipswich Railway Workshops War Memorial
 Isis District War Memorial and Shire Council Chambers
 Ithaca War Memorial
 Koumala War Memorial
 Linville War Memorial
 Lt Thomas Armstrong Memorial
 Ma Ma Creek War Memorial
 Manly War Memorial
 Maroon War Memorial
 Mary Watson's Monument
 Miriam Vale War Memorial
 Mitchell War Memorial
 Montville Memorial Precinct
 Mowbray Park and East Brisbane War Memorial
 Our Lady of Victories Catholic Church
 Oxley War Memorial
 Paroo Shire Honour Board
 Pilot Officer Geoffrey Lloyd Wells Memorial Seat
 Pimpama & Ormeau War Memorial
 Pinkenba War Memorial
 Queens Gardens, Brisbane
 Queensland Korean War Memorial
 Rockhampton War Memorial
 Roma War Memorial and Heroes Avenue
 Sandgate War Memorial Park
 Sarina War Memorial
 Shrine of Remembrance, Brisbane
 Sir William Glasgow Memorial
 Soldiers Memorial Hall, Toowoomba
 South African War Memorial, Brisbane
 St Andrew's Presbyterian Memorial Church, Innisfail
 St Monica's War Memorial Cathedral
 Stanthorpe Soldiers Memorial
 Stanwell, Queensland
 Strathpine Honour Board
 Temple of Peace (Toowong Cemetery)
 Tieri War Memorial
 Tobruk Memorial Baths
 Toogoolawah War Memorial
 Toowong Memorial Park
 Townsville West State School
 Traveston Powder Magazine
 Trooper Cobb's Grave
 Victor Denton War Memorial
 War Memorial Bridge, Brooweena
 Warwick War Memorial
 Weeping Mother Memorial
 Westbrook War Memorial
 Windsor War Memorial Park
 Woody Point Memorial Hall
 World War I Cenotaph, Mackay
 World War I memorials in Queensland
 Yeppoon War Memorial
 Yeronga Memorial Park

Brisbane

ANZAC Square

Brisbane CBD

Brisbane suburbs

Monument to non-Australian forces

Regional Queensland

South Australia

Tasmania
Tasmania has over 1000 war memorials, including memorial plantings and honour rolls.

Victoria

Western Australia
 there are more than 900 "war memorials and related objects" in Western Australia.

Perth metropolitan

 Axford Park memorial obelisk
 North Fremantle Fallen Soldiers' Memorial
 East Fremantle Roll of Honour

Kings Park
Kings Park in Perth includes several war memorials.

 Tobruk War Memorial
 Vietnam War Memorial
 Kings Park has several "honour avenues". These avenues are lined with trees, each tree having been planted in the memory of an individual who died in the war. A plaque in front of the tree identifies each person.

Monument Hill, Fremantle
The Monument Hill Memorial Reserve on High Street has several memorials.

 Merchant Navy Memorial
 Royal Australian Navy in Vietnam Memorial
 RAN Corvettes Memorial
 United States Submariners' Memorial

Rockingham

The Rockingham Naval Memorial Park, opened in 1996, is dedicated to the Royal Australian Navy and its activities during World War II, the Korean War and the Vietnam War. The memorial consists of three main parts, a walk way with commemorative plaques, the HMAS Orion fin and the HMAS Derwent gun turret.

The Rockingham War Memorial, opened in 2005, commemorates Australian servicemen and women from the district who died in service or were killed in action in conflicts involving Australia.

Albany

Albany has several memorials.
 Albany War Memorial
 ANZAC Peace Park
 Apex Drive Honour Avenue
 Mustafa Kemal Atatürk statue and Atatürk Entrance
 The Desert Mounted Corps Memorial on Mount Clarence
 RSL Nurses' Memorial Garden
 The Gallipoli Pine, Mount Clarence
 The South East Asia memorial in the Princess Royal Fortress
 National Anzac Centre, including the "Still On Patrol" memorial and the Merchant Navy Memorial

Outside of Australia
 Australian Memorial Park – France 
 Australian War Memorial – United Kingdom
 Mont Saint-Quentin Australian war memorial – France
 V.C. Corner Australian Cemetery and Memorial – France
 Villers–Bretonneux Australian National Memorial – France

See also

 Military Memorials of National Significance in Australia
 Virtual War Memorial Australia

References

External links

 
 Queensland War Memorial Register
 Australian Bunker & Military Museum

Military memorials